The Antoinette 8V was an early French eight-cylinder, liquid-cooled, V engine, the first series production gasoline-fueled, spark plug ignition engine of any kind produced with manifold injection. First produced in 1906 it was used on a number of early French aircraft, including Alberto Santos Dumont's 14 Bis and the Antoinette company's own Antoinette VII.

Specifications (Antoinette 8V)
Data for: Antoinette 8V

See also

References

  Engine Data Sheets - Mechanical Data tables
  Specifications: Antoinette 8V

External links

 Old Machine Press page on Antoinette (Levavasseur) aircraft engines

1900s aircraft piston engines